Amelia Curran (1775 – 1847) was an Irish portrait painter.

Biography

Amelia Curran was the eldest child of the barrister and wit John Philpot Curran and his wife Sarah Creagh. Her sister Sarah Curran was the fiancée of Robert Emmet. Amelia was a member of the Church of Ireland for the early part of her life. In 1810, through her father, she met novelist William Godwin  and  Aaron Burr, the American politician. Soon after, she met her lifelong friend, Percy Bysshe Shelley.

In 1812 Percy Shelley traveled to Ireland to campaign against the injustices done there under British rule and was introduced to her father.

Curran also painted a portrait of Shelley's three-and-a-half-year-old son William (called "Willmouse") in Rome, just before Willmouse's death from malaria in 1819.

She later traveled to Rome and built up a close friendship and correspondence with Shelley's second wife Mary. In 1821, Curran moved to Naples, where she converted to Catholicism. Moving to Paris the next year, it was falsely rumored that had she married and separated from a man. Curran returned to Rome in 1824 to spend the rest of her life.

Curran painted Shelley several times. These are among the few paintings of Shelley painted in his lifetime, and the only ones of him in his adulthood which was copied by several artists including Alfred Clint and William Holl among others. They are noted for their androgynous features, and their striking similarity to Guido Reni's painting of Beatrice Cenci, which was one of the poet's favorite pictures. Curran's 1819 portrait of Shelley was included in the 1905 book Women Painters of the World and hangs at the National Portrait Gallery in London.

Curran also painted a portrait of Claire Clairmont and made copies of several Renaissance Madonnas. During the same spring of 1819 when painting William Shelley, Curran received Percy and Mary Shelley for individual portraits along with Clairmont. Curran knew Mary and Clair as the stepdaughters of William Godwin since their childhood, from visiting their London home with her father.

Amelia Curran died in 1847 in Rome, and was cremated to rest in the Church of St. Isidore. The future Cardinal Newman presided at her funeral Mass.

References

Bibliography

Further reading
 Walter Shaw Sparrow (ed.) (1901) Women painters of the world. From the time of Caterina Vigri, 1413–1463 to Rosa Bonheur and the present day. London : Hodder.

External links

 

1775 births
1847 deaths
18th-century Irish painters
19th-century Irish painters
19th-century Irish women artists
18th-century Irish women artists
Converts to Roman Catholicism from Anglicanism
Women of the Regency era
Artists from Dublin (city)
Irish women painters
Irish expatriates in Italy
Irish expatriates in France